Al Ain Museum, also known as Al Ain Museum, is a museum in the city of Al Ain, within the Emirate of Abu Dhabi, the United Arab Emirates.

Description and history

The museum, the oldest in the UAE, is located next to the Eastern Fort (or Sultan Bin Zayed Fort). It is on the eastern side of the Al Ain Oasis, the largest oasis in Al Ain. It was built by the former UAE President, Sheikh Zayed Bin Sultan Al Nahyan, to house archaeological finds from the surrounding area, including the Hafit-era 'beehive' tombs near Mezyad. The museum was inaugurated by Sheikh Tahnoun bin Mohammed Al Nahyan, the Ruler's Representative in the Eastern Region, on 2 November 1971.

The museum has two main sections on ethnographic and archaeological aspects of the country, especially around Al Ain. It includes finds from the Bronze Age tombs at the Mezyad and Hili Archaeological Parks on the outskirts of Al Ain.

As of October 2018, there were plans to make restorations to the museum and fort.

See also
 Al Ain Palace Museum
 Cultural policy in Abu Dhabi
 List of cultural property of national significance in the United Arab Emirates
 List of museums in the United Arab Emirates

References

External links
 Museum website

Al-Mutawa'ah, Al-Ain
1971 establishments in the United Arab Emirates
Museums established in 1971
Museums in Al Ain
National museums of the United Arab Emirates
Archaeological museums
Ethnographic museums in Asia
1971 establishments in the Trucial States
1971 in the United Arab Emirates